"I Got a Feeling" is a 1966 song by The Four Tops.

I Got a Feeling, or similar, may also refer to:

I Got the Feelin' (album), a 1968 album by James Brown
 "I Got a Feeling" (Ricky Nelson song), a song by Ricky Nelson in 1958
 "I Got a Feelin'", a song by Willie Phelps in 1957
 "I Got a Feelin'" (Billy Currington song), a song by Billy Currington in 2004
 "I Got a Feeling", a 2021 song by Felix Jaehn and Robin Schulz
 "I Gotta Feelin (Just Nineteen)", a 2006 song by Eagles of Death Metal
 "I Gotta Feeling", a song by Black Eyed Peas in 2009
 "I've Got a Feeling", a song by The Beatles in 1970
 "I've Got a Feeling" (Ivy song), a song by Ivy in 1997
 "I Got the Feeling" (Today song), a song by Today in 1990
 "I Got the Feelin'", a song by James Brown in 1968
 "I Got the Feelin' (Oh No, No)", a song by Neil Diamond in 1966

See also
 "I Got a Feelin' in My Body", by Elvis Presley in 1979